Tikiri Banda 'T. B.' Werapitiya (16 July 1924 – 18 May 1996) was a Sri Lankan police officer and a politician. He was the former Minister of Internal Security.

Werapitiya was born on 16 July 1924 the youngest of three sons to S. B. Werapitiya, the Rate Mahatmaya of Pathadumbara in Kandy. He was educated at Trinity College, Kandy and graduated from University of Ceylon. He then became a teacher at Jinaraja College, Gampola, and later at Mahinda College, Galle. He also played for the All Ceylon Cricket Team, captained by B.R. Heyn.

He then joined the Ceylon Police Force as a Probationary Assistant Superintendent of Police. Serving may capacities including Director of the Police Training School, he reached the rank of Senior Deputy Inspector General of Police retiring in 1974.

He entered politics in 1977, contesting the Pathadumbara Electoral District and gaining a seat in Parliament. He was appointed Deputy Minister of Defence and later Minister of Internal Security by President J. R. Jayewardene. He was the President of the Cricket Board in 1979.

Retiring from politics in 1989, he died on 18 May 1996.

See also
Sri Lankan Civil War

References

External links
 Official Website of United National Party

1924 births
1996 deaths
Members of the 8th Parliament of Sri Lanka
United National Party politicians
Sinhalese police officers
Sinhalese politicians
Alumni of Trinity College, Kandy